Dewan Mokham Chand Nayyar (died 29 October 1814) was a general of Ranjit Singh, the ruler of the Sikh Empire.

Early life 

Mokham Chand was born in a Hindu Khatri family, to Vaisakhi Mal, a tradesman of the village Kunjah near Gujrat.

Military career 

Mokham Chand was one of the most distinguished general of Ranjit Singh.

Ranjit Singh had seen him in action at Akalgarh three years earlier and again in the fight against the Bhangi Sardar of Gujrat. Mokham Chand had fallen out with the Bhangi and came to Ranjit Singh upon his request. Ranjit welcomed him with handsome gifts of an elephant and horses and granted him the Dallewalia possessions as a Jagir. He was made commander of a cavalry unit with the power to recruit 1500 foot soldiers as well.

He was the commander in chief of armies in Battle of Attock which defeated Durrani Empire Wazir Fateh Khan and Dost Mohammad Khan. With the permission of the Maharaja, the Sikh forces attacked the Afghans on 12 July, 1813 at Hazro, about 8 kilometers from Attock. This battle is also known as the battle of Chhuchh. Terrible fighting took place between the adversaries. In the meantime, Afghans received fresh reinforcements under Dost Muhammad Khan.
The Diwan left his elephant, mounted a horse and personally leading his reserves fell upon the disorganized Afghans. Hand to hand fighting took place and there were heavy losses on both sides. Diwan Amar Nath mentions that 2,000 Afghans were killed. Dost Muhammad was seriously wounded. Many Afghans drowned in the Indus and a large number were taken prisoner. The Sikhs plundered the provisions of the Afghans. Besides Diwan Mohkam Chand, Jodh Singh Kalsia and Fateh Singh Ahluwalia, Sardar Dal Singh, Diwan Ram Dayal also took part in fighting against Afghans at Hazro. Fateh Khan fled away to Peshawar. Thus the victory for the Sikhs was complete. The credit for this major triumph goes to the dynamic generalship of Diwan Mohkam Chand. Hukam Singh Chimni was appointed Qiladar of the fort of Attock.

Death and successors 

He died at Phillaur on 29 October 1814, on a Saturday. His son Diwan Moti Ram Nayyar and grandsons Diwan Kirpa Ram Nayyar and Diwan Ram Dayal Nayyar (appointed as Governor of Attock) and Great Grand son Diwan Mulraj Nayyar whose son Adj. Bishambar Nayyar (Poona Horse) and grandson Brig.Ajit Nayyar (Indian Army) served in the Indian army with distinction.  who too rendered meritorious services to the Sikh State. He was one of the architects of the Sikh empire who rose by dint of merit to the post of Diwan and virtually the commander-in-chief of the Sikh forces. N. K. Sinha observes. "As a general, he was uniformly successful and from 1806 to 1814 the annexation of Ranjit Singh was due not only to his irresistible cunning but also to Mohkam Chand's military talents." Ranjit Singh always held him in high esteem. He had a sound knowledge of military tactics and strategy. He did not suffer a defeat; he was an ever victorious General.

See also 
Battle of Attock
Maharaja Ranjit Singh's Generals

References 

People of the Sikh Empire
History of Punjab
Punjabi people